Tielman, or Tieleman, is a primarily archaic Dutch given name that could be of West Frisian origin or was a nickname of Theodorus. It also exist as a patronymic surname. Notable people with the name include:

Given name 
Tielman van Gameren (1632–1706), Dutch architect and engineer working in Poland as Tylman Gamerski
Tielman Roos (1879–1935), South African politician and minister
Tielman Susato (also Tylman)1510–1570, Renaissance composer, instrumentalist and publisher of music in Antwerp

Surname 
Andy Tielman (1936–2011), Indonesia-born Dutch singer and guitarist
Tielman Brothers, his 1950s Dutch-Indo band
 (born 1946), Dutch sociologist

See also
Dielman (disambiguation)
Tielemans
Tilman
Tillmann (disambiguation)
Tylman

References 

Dutch masculine given names
Patronymic surnames